Cynaeda plebejalis is a moth in the family Crambidae. It was described by Hugo Theodor Christoph in 1882. It is found in Azerbaijan.

References

Moths described in 1882
Odontiini